Alexander Joseph Rummler (July 25, 1867 – 1959) was an American painter best known for his work on murals and billboards.

Rummler was born in Dubuque, Iowa to German immigrants Joseph and Rosalia Rummler. In 1888 Rummler traveled to New York to study art at the Art Students League of New York. In 1905 Rummler moved with his wife, Maria, and their children to Europe to further study painting at the Académie Julian in Paris with Jean-Paul Laurens. He moved to South Norwalk, Connecticut in 1907.

Rummler became known nationwide at the end of World War I when his painting of the signing of the armistice was displayed on billboards. In 1926 he was chosen to represent Connecticut in the Philadelphia Exposition of 1926, where his paintings took first place.

In 1936 Rummler began working for the Works Progress Administration painting murals for the then still under construction Norwalk High School. He painted sixteen murals and eight smaller panels depicting life in Norwalk. During this time he also served as town treasurer of Norwalk.

In 1942 Rummler moved to Stamford, Connecticut. He died at the age of 92 in 1959.

References

External links

 

1867 births
1959 deaths
Académie Julian alumni
American muralists
19th-century American painters
American male painters
20th-century American painters
People from Dubuque, Iowa
People from Norwalk, Connecticut
Artists from Stamford, Connecticut
Federal Art Project artists
American people of German descent
19th-century American male artists
20th-century American male artists